
Year 175 BC was a year of the pre-Julian Roman calendar. At the time it was known as the Year of the Consulship of Scaevola and Lepidus (or, less frequently, year 579 Ab urbe condita). The denomination 175 BC for this year has been used since the early medieval period, when the Anno Domini calendar era became the prevalent method in Europe for naming years.

Events 
 By place 
 Seleucid Empire 
 King Seleucus IV of Syria arranges for the exchange of his brother Antiochus for Demetrius, the son of Seleucus IV, who has been a hostage in Rome following the Treaty of Apamea in 188 BC. However, Seleucus IV is assassinated by his chief minister Heliodorus who then seizes the Syrian throne.
 Antiochus manages to oust Heliodorus and takes advantage of Demetrius' captivity in Rome to seize the throne for himself under the name Antiochus IV Epiphanes.
 During this period of uncertainty in Syria, the Egyptian ruler, Ptolemy VI, lays claim to Coele Syria, Palestine, and Phoenicia, which the Seleucid king Antiochus III has previously conquered. Both the Syrian and Egyptian parties appeal to Rome for help, but the Roman Senate refuses to take sides.
 Timarchus is appointed governor of Media in western Persia by Antiochus IV to deal with the growing threat from the Parthians while Timarchus' brother, Heracleides, becomes minister of the royal finances.

 By topic 
 Art 
 The construction of the western front of the altar in Pergamum, Turkey begins (approximate date) and is finished in 156 BC. A reconstruction of it is now kept at the Staatliche Museen zu Berlin, Preussischer Kulturbesitz, Pergamonmuseum in Berlin.

Deaths 
 Quintus Caecilius Metellus, Roman consul and dictator (b. c. 250 BC)
 Seleucus IV Philopator, king of the Seleucid dynasty, who has ruled since 187 BC (b. c. 217 BC) 
Cleopatra I of Egypt, mother of Ptolemy VI.

References